Anthony Leonard (born February 28, 1953 in Richmond, Virginia) is a former cornerback and return specialist in the National Football League. He played from 1976 to 1979 for the San Francisco 49ers and the Detroit Lions.

External links
NFL.com player page

1953 births
Living people
Players of American football from Richmond, Virginia
American football cornerbacks
American football return specialists
Virginia Union Panthers football players
San Francisco 49ers players
Detroit Lions players